Shute Barrington (26 May 173425 March 1826) was an English churchman, Bishop of Llandaff in Wales, as well as Bishop of Salisbury and Bishop of Durham in England.

Early life
Barrington was born at Beckett Hall in Shrivenham in Berkshire (now Oxfordshire), the home of his father, John Barrington, 1st Viscount Barrington and mother, Anne née Daines, and educated at Eton College and Merton College, Oxford.

Church career
Barrington was ordained a deacon by Thomas Secker, Bishop of Oxford, on 28 November 1756 at St Aldate's Church, Oxford; he was presumably ordained a priest within a year. In 1761 he was a made a canon of Christ Church, Oxford and in 1768 a canon of St Paul's from where he moved to be a canon at St George's Chapel, Windsor. In 1769 he was elevated to the episcopate as Bishop of Llandaff; his election was confirmed on 23 September and he was consecrated a bishop on 1 October at Lambeth Palace chapel by Frederick Cornwallis, Archbishop of Canterbury (assisted by Richard Terrick, Bishop of London, and Zachary Pearce, Bishop of Rochester.) He was elected on 14 August 1782 to become Bishop of Salisbury, and was translated to that see upon the confirmation of that election on 27 August at St Mary le Bow. As Bishop of Salisbury he was also ex officio Chancellor of the Order of the Garter. He was further translated to be Bishop of Durham following his election on 25 June 1791.

Barrington was a vigorous Protestant, though willing to grant Roman Catholics "every degree of toleration short of political power and establishment." He published several volumes of sermons and tracts, and wrote the political life of his elder brother, William Barrington. From 1805 to 1826 he was the Visitor of Balliol College, Oxford and in 1806 backed the then Master, John Parsons, in opening the Fellowships to competition.

Barrington was a great patron of architecture and education in the diocese of Durham. One school, Bishop Barrington Academy, still exists today in Bishop Auckland. To mark his fiftieth year in the prelacy, the diocese of Durham built the Clergy Jubilee School in Newcastle and arranged that Dame Allan's Schools should be housed there. In architecture he employed James Wyatt to remodel Salisbury Cathedral, as well as the Georgian Gothic interiors of Auckland Castle, his favoured residence.

One notably uncharacteristic event in Barrington's life was his dispatch of troops on 1 January 1812 to break up a miners' strike at collieries owned by the Dean & chapter of Durham Cathedral in nearby Chester-le-Street. At this time (and up until 1836), the "Prince" Bishops of Durham still held vice-regal powers in the North of England, which included the maintenance of a small private army, garrisoned in Durham Castle.

Barrington was also a primary litigant in Morice v Bishop of Durham (1805)10 Ves 522, which is a leading case on the conditions necessary to form a trust in English law.

Barrington had an extensive correspondence with Thomas Moody, who named one of his sons, Shute Barrington Moody (b. 1818), after Shute Barrington.

He died in Soho in Middlesex (now Greater London). He is buried at St John the Baptist's Church, near his home at Mongewell Park, close to Wallingford, Oxfordshire.

Memorials

A fine marble monument was erected to Barrington's memory in Durham Cathedral.

Marriages
Barrington married firstly, on 2 February 1761, the Lady Diana Beauclerk (c. 1735–28 March 1766), daughter of Charles Beauclerk, 2nd Duke of St Albans. His wife died in childbirth, the child stillborn. He married secondly, on 20 June 1770, Jane Guise (d. 8 August 1807), daughter of Sir John Guise, but had no children.

Styles and titles
1734–1756: The Honourable Shute Barrington
1756–1761: The Reverend and Honourable Shute Barrington
1761–1769: The Reverend and Honourable Canon Shute Barrington
1769–1826: The Right Reverend and Honourable Shute Barrington

References

1734 births
1826 deaths
People from Shrivenham
People educated at Eton College
Fellows of Merton College, Oxford
Canons of Windsor
Bishops of Durham
Bishops of Llandaff
Bishops of Salisbury
18th-century Church of England bishops
19th-century Church of England bishops
Younger sons of viscounts
Chancellors of the Order of the Garter
Alumni of Merton College, Oxford
18th-century Welsh Anglican bishops